Li Fuyu (born May 9, 1978) is a Chinese former professional road bicycle racer, who currently works as a directeur sportif for UCI Continental team .

Career
The Discovery Channel team was disbanded at the end of the highly successful 2007 season, and Li moved on to the newly re-established China-based  for the 2008 season. In 2010, Li rode the newly formed , reuniting with Bruyneel.

In April 2010, he was dismissed from  after a doping test revealed clenbuterol, a performance-enhancing compound. Li announced that he would retire from cycling competition at the end of the 2013 season.

Major results

2006
 1st Overall Tour of Thailand
1st Stage 3
 1st Westfalen Preis
 7th Overall Tour of South China Sea
 8th Overall Tour of Siam
 10th Road race, Asian Games
2008
 1st Stage 1 Jelajah Malaysia
 4th Road race, Asian Road Championships
2012
 1st  Greater China riders classification Tour of China II
 4th Overall Tour of Fuzhou

References

External links 
Profile at ThePaceline.com

Chinese male cyclists
Doping cases in cycling
Chinese sportspeople in doping cases
1978 births
Living people
Sportspeople from Jinan
Cyclists from Shandong
Asian Games medalists in cycling
Cyclists at the 1998 Asian Games
Cyclists at the 2002 Asian Games
Cyclists at the 2006 Asian Games
Medalists at the 1998 Asian Games
Medalists at the 2002 Asian Games
Asian Games bronze medalists for China
Cycling coaches
21st-century Chinese people